Eswatini Bank, also known as Eswatini Development & Savings Bank (EDSP), is a development finance institution, which doubles as a commercial bank in Eswatini. It is licensed and supervised by the Central Bank of Eswatini, the national banking regulator.  Eswatini Bank was the only indigenous commercial bank in the country, with the other three having their headquarters in neighboring South Africa.

Location
The headquarters of Eswatini Bank are located in the Engungwini Building, on Gwamile Street, in Mbabane, the capital and largest city in Eswatini.

History
The bank was established in 1965 by Sobhuza II, who reigned from 10 December 1899 until 21 August 1982, to finance development projects in the county. In 2014, Eswatini Bank, in collaboration with MasterCard International, began issuing credit and debit card branded with the MasterCard logo.

Ownership
Eswatini Bank is 100 percent owned by the Government of Eswatini.

Branches
, the bank maintains branches at the following locations:

 Main Branch: Engungwini Building, Gwamile Street, Mbabane
 Mbabane Commercial Branch: Umlunguzi Wendlovu Building, Mbabane 
 Manzini Branch: Nkoseluhlaza Street, Manzini
 Matsapha Branch: Matsapha Shopping Complex, Matsapha 
 Piggs Peak Branch: Evelyn Baring Avenue, Piggs Peak
 Nhlangano Branch: 5th Street, Nhlangano
 Siteki Branch: Jacaranda Avenue, Siteki
 Matata Branch: Matata Shopping Complex, Matata
 Simunye Branch: Simunye Shopping Complex, Simunye 
 Siphofaneni Branch: Nokuphila Shopping Complex, Siphofaneni
 Gables Branch: The Gables Shopping Complex, Ezulwini Valley.

See also
 List of banks in Eswatini
 List of banks in South Africa

References

External links
 Webpage of Eswatini Bank

Banks of Eswatini
Banks established in 1965
1965 establishments in Swaziland
Mbabane